Goalball at the 1972 Summer Paralympics was a demonstration sport. There were no medals awarded.

References 

 

1972 Summer Paralympics events
1972
1972 in sports
Goalball in Germany